Wickham Wasps Rugby League Club  is an Australian rugby league club from Wickham, Western Australia. They conduct teams for Juniors, Seniors  and Ladies teams to compete in the Pilbara Rugby League competition.

See also

Rugby league in Western Australia

References

External links
Wickham Wasps Fox Sports pulse
Wickham Wasps Team App

Rugby league teams in Western Australia
Rugby clubs established in 1991
1991 establishments in Australia